China–Hungary relations refers to the bilateral relations between China and Hungary. Relations have been generally positive, especially under Hungarian prime minister Viktor Orbán. China has an embassy in Budapest. Hungary has an embassy in Beijing and consulates-general in Chongqing, Guangzhou, Hong Kong and Shanghai.

History 
In 2021, it was revealed that Fudan University was planning a campus in Budapest. This led to pushback in the country and to protests, leading the Hungarian government to delay the plans and promise that it will hold a referendum on the issue. On 22 May 2022, the Constitutional Court ruled the referendum as unconstitutional as it concerns an international agreement. Hungarian officials also promised to resume the project after the victory of the ruling Fidesz during the 2022 parliamentary elections.

Hungary has formally blocked the European Union from formally criticizing China's actions in Hong Kong.

On 20 February 2023, Chinese Communist Party (CCP) Politburo member and top diplomat Wang Yi visited Budapest to meet with prime minister Orbán. During the meeting, Hungarian foreign minister Péter Szijjártó stated that "[w]hen we have faced crises in recent years, Hungary has always come out of them stronger than it went into them, but Hungarian-Chinese cooperation has played an absolutely indispensable role in this".

On 27 February 2023, Orbán backed the peace plan released by Chinese Communist Party Politburo member and top diplomat Wang Yi about ending Russia's invasion of Ukraine.

Economic relations 
Hungary joined the Belt and Road Initiative in 2015. In the same year, it was the largest recipient of Chinese outbound direct investment with around $571 million.

In 2022, Chinese battery company CATL agreed to invest $7.5 billion to build a factory in Debrecen.

Hungarian foreign minister Szijjártó stated in 2023 that Hungarian-Chinese trade was over $10 billion.

Hungary hosts the largest supply center of Huawei outside of China.

See also
Foreign relations of China
Foreign relations of Hungary

References 

 
Bilateral relations of China
Bilateral relations of Hungary